Wiener (from German: "Viennese") may refer to:

Food
 A Polish sausage (kielbasa) or "wenar"
 A Vienna sausage of German origin, named after the capital of Austria
 A hot dog, a cooked sausage, traditionally grilled or steamed and served in a sliced bun

People
 Wiener (surname)

Places
Wiener Neudorf, a town in the eastern part of the Mödling district, Austria
Wiener Neustadt, a town south of Vienna, in the state of Lower Austria, Austria
Wiener Stadthalle, an indoor arena, in Vienna, Austria
Wiener Staatsoper, the Vienna State Opera

Other uses
The Wiener AC, also known as Wiener AC or WAC, an Austrian sports club in Vienna
 Wiener process, a mathematical model related to Brownian motion
 Wiener equation, named after Norbert Wiener, assumes the current velocity of a fluid particle fluctuates randomly
 Wiener filter, a noise filter used in signal processing
 Wiener (crater), a crater on the far side of the Moon
Wiener Bonbons, a waltz by Johan Strauss II
The Wiener Börse, a stock exchange in Vienna, Austria
The Wiener Library, the world's oldest institution devoted to the study of the Holocaust
The Wiener Werkstätte, an Austrian production community of visual artists
The Wiener Sport-Club, an Austrian athletic club
Wiener Zeitung, an Austrian newspaper
 Wiener (magazine), an Austrian men's magazine
 Wiener dog, colloquial term for dachshund
Wieners (film), a 2008 American film
Slang term for penis

See also 
 
 Weiner (disambiguation)

German-language surnames
Jewish surnames